Rogalin  is a village in western Poland, situated on the river Warta. It is best known for the Rogalin Landscape Park (with the oldest oak trees in Poland), the Baroque palace, art gallery, and neoclassical church with the mausoleum of the Raczyński family.

Overview

Rogalin is primarily famous for its 18th-century Polish Baroque palace of the Raczyński family, and the adjacent Raczyński Art Gallery, housing a permanent exhibition of paintings by the Polish and foreign artists of international renown including Paul Delaroche and Claude Monet as well as the famous Jan Matejko's large-size painting Joanna d'Arc (see a fragment below). The gallery was founded by Count Edward Aleksander Raczyński. Rogalin is also known for its putatively 800-year-old oak trees on the flood plains of the Warta and the historical St. Marcellinus Church, whose design was inspired by the Roman temple Maison Carrée in Nîmes, France.

The last owner of the estate was Count Edward Bernard Raczyński, who was from 1979 to 1986 was President of the Polish Republic in exile. His sarcophagus is deposited in the Raczyński Mausoleum, under the church in Rogalin. In his testament, Count Raczyński bequeathed his estate in Rogalin (including the family palace, gallery, library, and church) to the Raczyński Family Foundation (its president is the Director of the National Museum in Poznań).

Geography

Much of the surrounding landscape forms the protected area of recognized natural and ecological value known as the Rogalin Landscape Park.

References

 Adam Wyszynski, Photos from Rogalin at Rogalin.eu

External links

Villages in Poznań County
Tourist attractions in Greater Poland Voivodeship
Palaces in Poland